The 1987 24 Hours of Le Mans was the 55th Grand Prix of Endurance, and took place on 13 and 14 June 1987.  It was also the fifth round of the 1987 World Sports-Prototype Championship.

Track alterations
A chicane was installed in the middle of the Dunlop Curve, just prior to the Dunlop Bridge, in an attempt to slow speeds for sportscars as they went from the main straight to the Esses.  The new chicane was also intended to slow motorcycles for races on the Bugatti Circuit.

Pre race
With the cancellation of the B Class, the race was the first in the history of Le Mans to lack any homologated class entries.  The hiatus would last until 1993.

Race
Porsche 962C cars suffered from piston failure due to the wrong microchip fitted for fuel management, causing a lean mixture and burned pistons.  The #17 car of Bell, Stuck, and Holbert escaped this fate with a new chip fitted, running largely uncontested to the finish.

Official results
Class winners in bold.  Cars failing to complete 70% of the winner's distance marked as Not Classified (NC).

Statistics
 Pole Position - Bob Wollek, #18 Rothmans Porsche AG - 3:21.090 
 Fastest Lap - Johnny Dumfries, #62 Kouros Racing - 3:25.400
 Distance - 4791.777 km
 Average Speed - 199.661 km/h

References

 
 

24 Hours of Le Mans races
Le Mans
Le Mans
Le Mans